Turkey of the Ottomans is an anthropological book written by Lucy Garnett and published by Charles Scribner's Sons in 1911. The book is a collection of summaries on socio-cultural and political structures of the Ottoman Empire in the early 20th century. It's compiled from both the author's first-hand experiences during her time in Turkey and third-hand sources. The book received good receptions at the time of its release.

Chapters 

 Muslim Ottomans
 Christian Ottomans
 Hebrew Ottomans
 The Ottoman Sultan
 The Ottoman Parliament
 Law Courts, Police and Army
 The Religion of Islam
 Christianity in Turkey
 Judaism in Turkey
 Urban Life
 Agrarian Turkey
 Pastoral Turkey
 Ottoman Homes and Home-Life
 Education and Life
 Turkey at Play
 Index

New editions 
Since the 2010s, many more publishing houses such as Palala Press, Kessinger Publishing, Forgotten Books have released modernized new editions of the book.

References 

Non-fiction books about Turkey